The Outside Within is an album by American jazz saxophonist Chico Freeman recorded in 1978 and released on the India Navigation label.

Reception
The Allmusic review by Scott Yanow awarded the album 4½ stars stating "The music is often influenced by the scales of the Far East, yet also has the warmth and extroverted emotions of the west. All of the musicians have opportunities to make strong contributions, and the top-notch players (some of the finest) are heard throughout in top form".

Track listing
All compositions by Chico Freeman except as indicated
 "The Search" - 7:00  
 "Undercurrent" (Cecil McBee) - 19:38  
 "Luna" - 7:34  
 "Ascent" - 7:41

Personnel
Chico Freeman - tenor saxophone, bass clarinet
John Hicks - piano
Cecil McBee - bass
Jack DeJohnette - drums

References 

India Navigation albums
Chico Freeman albums
1981 albums